Hermon High School is a public high school in Hermon, Maine, United States. It is part of the Hermon Public Schools district and has been accredited by the New England Association of Schools and Colleges.

History 
Hermon High School is a two-story building that was completed in 1995.

The 2008–2009 Cheerleading team swept all four competitions held in Maine, winning first at PVC's, Big East, Regionals and States.  They placed sixth in the New England Cheerleading Competition.

The 2017-2018 Boys Basketball team won their first State Championship defeating Wells 55–34.

Notable alumni
Dana White, businessman and the current president of the Ultimate Fighting Championship (UFC)

References 

Schools in Penobscot County, Maine
Public high schools in Maine